National Cattlemen's Beef Association (NCBA) is an American trade association and lobbying group working for American beef producers.

Advertising campaign
National Cattlemen's Beef Association is a contractor to the Beef Checkoff, which is the group responsible for the ad campaign run in the U.S. using the slogan "Beef. It's What's For Dinner". Music from the ballet Rodeo by Aaron Copland is used in the radio and television commercials. On January 21, 2008, Matthew McConaughey became the spokesman of the organization, having taken over from Sam Elliott and the late Jim Davis and Robert Mitchum. 
The Dinner ad replaced Beef. Real food for real people. James Garner was spokesman until he underwent quintuple heart bypass surgery.

The NCBA, as a contractor to the Beef Checkoff, cannot promote or financially support any political candidates or campaigns. The NCBA has disputed that the beef industry contributes to climate change and has even claimed that the beef industry has a beneficial impact on climate change. The NCBA has lobbied for sustainability of the land and resources that their members use.

Beef Checkoff Assessment 
National Cattlemen's Beef Association is funded by membership dues and sponsorships. NCBA also serves as a contractor to the Beef Checkoff on a cost recovery basis.  The Beef Checkoff program was established as part of the 1985 Farm Bill. The checkoff assesses $1 per head on the sale of live domestic and imported cattle, in addition to a comparable assessment on imported beef and beef products. The checkoff assessment became mandatory when the program was approved by 79 percent of producers in a 1988 national referendum vote. The Cattlemen's Beef Board and United States Department of Agriculture oversee the distribution of Checkoff funds, and by law, the funds cannot be used to influence government policy or support political candidates.

Events
It hosts the Cattle Industry Annual Convention & NCBA Trade Show, the Cattle Industry Summer business Meeting, and multiple other events throughout the year.  NCBA also producers the television show Cattlemen to Cattlemen and various other digital media outlets.

Legislation
National Cattlemen's Beef Association sets annual policy priorities that are supposed to strengthen the cattle industry's economic, environmental, and social sustainability. Some of the policies issues they promote are opportunities to increased access to market data, increased trade exports, and increased risk management tools for farmers and ranchers. NCBA advocates for voluntary price discovery in the market and a cattle contract library while opposing mandatory country of origin labeling. 

In 2021, the Biden administration repealed the Navigable Waters Protection Rule, enacted under past President Donald Trump. NCBA did not support the repeal and "propose new regulations on common agricultural water features that only flow during rain events." "NCBA strongly supports the Environmental Protection Agency’s Farm, Ranch, and Rural Communities Advisory Committee's recommendation to develop a clear and limited WOTUS definition and protect key exemptions for common agricultural features,” says Scott Yager, NCBA’s Chief Environmental Counselor.

In 2013, National Cattlemen's Beef Association supported the Water Rights Protection Act, a bill that would have prevented federal agencies from requiring certain entities to relinquish their water rights to the United States to use public lands.

In 1996, cattle prices decreased substantially, and National Cattlemen's Beef Association lobbied the US federal government for assistance.

See also
 Canadian Cattlemen's Association
 Got Milk?
 Wise Use Movement

References

External links
 

National Cattlemen's Beef Association
501(c)(6) nonprofit organizations
Food industry trade groups
Trade associations based in the United States
Cattle in the United States
Organizations established in 1996
American cattlemen